Ram Bhagat Paswan also spelt Bagat is an Indian politician. He was elected to the Lok Sabha, the lower house of the Parliament of India from the Rosera in Bihar as a member of the Indian National Congress.

References

External links
Official biographical sketch in Parliament of India website

1933 births
Indian National Congress politicians
India MPs 1984–1989
India MPs 1971–1977
Rajya Sabha members from Bihar
2010 deaths